Peloponnisos (Greek: Πελοπόννησος) is a Greek regional daily newspaper published in Patras, the capital of the Peloponnese peninsula from which took its name.

It was founded in 1886 and remains one of the most widely circulated papers in the city of Patras. It is sold also in parts of Peloponnesus and Athens. It is one of the oldest surviving and most historic newspapers in Greece.

See also 
 List of newspapers in Greece

References

General Books
 Νίκος Ε. Πολίτης, Χρονικό του πατραϊκού τύπου 1840-1940, Patras 1984. (in Greek)

External links
Peloponnisos Official Website

Daily newspapers published in Greece
Newspapers published in Patras
Publications established in 1886
1886 establishments in Greece